Ryan Mau (born November 27, 1978) is an American college baseball coach. He pitched one season at Flagler and three at College of Charleston before two seasons in the Miami Marlins organization and one in independent baseball.  His coaching career began at Charleston Southern, where he served as pitching coach for one year.  He next moved to Marist for two seasons, guiding the Metro Atlantic Athletic Conference pitcher and relief pitcher of the year en route to the MAAC regular season and tournament championship and an NCAA Regional appearance.  Next, he moved to VMI where he rose to associate head coach. He helped the Keydets to a school record in wins and their first national rankings, while his pitching staff set school records and ranked among the nation's leaders is several categories. He next moved to Navy, where he served as recruiting coordinator and pitching and catching coach. He helped the Midshipmen to an NCAA Regional appearance. He then served as the head coach of the Longwood Lancers (2015–2021).

Head coaching record

References

External links

1978 births
Baseball pitchers
Charleston Southern Buccaneers baseball coaches
College of Charleston Cougars baseball players
Flagler Saints baseball players
Living people
Longwood Lancers baseball coaches
Marist Red Foxes baseball coaches
Navy Midshipmen baseball coaches
VMI Keydets baseball coaches